Seč Dam is an artificial drinking water reservoir located in Pardubice Region, Czech Republic. It supplies cities of Pardubice and Chrudim and is also an important tourist destination located in protected area Iron Mountains. The dam has also regulatory function and its water is used in some water power plants.

Location
Seč Dam is the largest dam in the Iron Mountains Protected Landscape Area. It is located on river Chrudimka in a valley close to the town of the same name, about 20 kilometers from Chrudim and 25 kilometers from Pardubice. The reservoir is approx. 7 kilometers long and is situated at 490 meters above the sea level.

History
The dam was constructed between 1925 and 1934 as a protection against floods. As a result of the construction, 22 buildings were depopulated and flooded. Remains of some of them are popular destination for scuba divers. A small power plant was constructed between 1941 and 1946. In 1947 another smaller reservoir was constructed approx 1 km from the main reservoir and it is called Seč II.

Biosystem
The environmentally most valuable part of Seč are Ostrůvek and the Oheb peninsula, which consists of a steep rock that ends with a small rocky promontory covered with pines. This place is a home to some rare invertebrate species (snails, beetles) as well as a natural habitat of Eurasian eagle-owls. The forest that covers the Oheb rock consists of some very old species of European beeches. Dead trees are left to decay and become hosts for a wide range of polypores that feed on their dead wood.

Tourism
The reservoir and its surroundings are the main tourist attraction of the Iron Mounrain Region. It is used for recreational purposes and water sports.

Ecology
Oheb and Ostrůvek are protected natural areas threatened by tourists that visit these sites. Another ecological issue is the wastewater from surrounding villages and recreational objects that contaminates the reservoir. It does not represent a direct risk to the people who swim in the water but it causes algal bloom. In some cases, large areas of green "tufts" can be observed. This was originally believed to be caused by manure washed down from the fields close to the reservoir, but results of recent researches proved that fluoride compounds from manure are insoluble in water so it cannot be the primary cause. The algal bloom season on Seč may start as soon as in June and gets worse when there's lack of rain which reduces the water flow. It is recommended to have a shower after swimming in the water or avoid entering the water when the situations worsens.

Gallery

References

Dams in the Czech Republic
Dams completed in 1934
Chrudim District
1934 establishments in Czechoslovakia
20th-century architecture in the Czech Republic